Norman Aldridge (23 February 1921 – 14 January 2007) was an English footballer who played in the Football League for West Bromwich Albion and Northampton Town as a full-back.

References

External links
 

1921 births
2007 deaths
Footballers from Coventry
English footballers
English Football League players
Association football fullbacks
West Bromwich Albion F.C. players
Northampton Town F.C. players
Oxford United F.C. players